The 2014 Big South men's basketball tournament was the postseason men's basketball tournament for the Big South Conference that took place from March 5–9, 2014, at the HTC Center in Conway, South Carolina. Both semifinal games were broadcast on ESPN3, and the championship game was televised on ESPN2.

Format
All 12 teams were eligible for the tournament. Seeding was decided by divisions – the top two teams with the best overall conference records in each division received the top four seeds in the championship and first-round byes. The remaining seeds were determined based on division finish. In the event of a tie for a particular seed, the seed was determined within each division.

The #1 seeds of each division faced the winner of the game between the #4 seed from the opposite division and the #5 seed from the team's same division in the quarterfinal round. Similarly, the #2 seeds of each division faced the winner of the #3 seed from the opposite division and the #6 seed from the same division. The semifinal round featured the winner of the #1 seeds' quarterfinal games against the winner of the game featuring the #2 seeds from the opposite division.

Seeds

Schedule

*Game times in Eastern Time. #Rankings denote tournament seeding.

Bracket

References

Tournament
Big South Conference men's basketball tournament
Big South Conference men's basketball tournament
Big South Conference men's basketball tournament